Jamie Becker-Finn (born October 20, 1982) is an American politician serving in the Minnesota House of Representatives since 2017. A member of the Minnesota Democratic–Farmer–Labor Party (DFL), Becker-Finn represents District 42B in the northeastern Twin Cities metropolitan area, which includes the cities of Roseville and Shoreview and parts of Ramsey County, Minnesota.

Early life, education, and career
Becker-Finn was born on October 20, 1982. Her father, Harold "Skip" Finn, was a Minnesota state senator of Ojibwe and Norwegian descent, and her mother, Teri, is also of Norwegian descent. Becker-Finn was raised in Cass Lake, Minnesota, on the Leech Lake Indian Reservation, where she graduated from Cass Lake-Bena Public Schools. She attended the University of Minnesota, graduating with a Bachelor of Arts in psychology. She later attended William Mitchell College of Law, graduating with a Juris Doctor.

Becker-Finn is an assistant attorney for Hennepin County, specializing in domestic violence. She was a legislative assistant for the Minnesota House Tax Committee from 2007 to 2008, a clerk for the Minnesota Fourth District Court in Hennepin County, and a member of the Roseville Parks and Recreation Commission.

Minnesota House of Representatives
Becker-Finn was elected to the Minnesota House of Representatives in 2016, after incumbent Jason Isaacson retired to run for a seat in the Minnesota State Senate, and has been reelected every two years since. 

From 2019-20 Becker-Finn served as an assistant majority leader for the DFL House Caucus. Becker-Finn has served as chair of the Judiciary Finance and Civil Law Committee since 2021, and sits on the Public Safety Finance and Policy, Ways and Means, and Workforce Development Finance and Policy Committees.

Electoral history

Personal life
Becker-Finn and her husband, Gabe, reside in Roseville, Minnesota. They have two children. Becker-Finn is a descendant of the Leech Lake Band of Ojibwe.

References

External links

 Official House of Representatives website
 Official campaign website

1982 births
Living people
People from Cass Lake, Minnesota
People from Roseville, Minnesota
Ojibwe people
William Mitchell College of Law alumni
University of Minnesota College of Liberal Arts alumni
Minnesota lawyers
Democratic Party members of the Minnesota House of Representatives
Native American state legislators in Minnesota
21st-century American politicians
21st-century American women politicians
Women state legislators in Minnesota
21st-century Native American women
21st-century Native Americans